The Rogue River–Siskiyou National Forest is a United States National Forest in the U.S. states of Oregon and California.  The formerly separate Rogue River and Siskiyou National Forests were administratively combined in 2004.  Now, the Rogue River–Siskiyou National Forest ranges from the crest of the Cascade Range west into the Siskiyou Mountains, covering almost . Forest headquarters are located in Medford, Oregon.

Geography 
The former Rogue River portion of the Rogue River–Siskiyou National Forest is located in parts of five counties in southern Oregon and northern California. In descending order of land area they are Jackson, Klamath, Douglas, Siskiyou, and Josephine counties, with Siskiyou County being the only one in California. There are local ranger district offices located in Ashland, Butte Falls, Grants Pass, Jacksonville, and Prospect.

The former Siskiyou portion of the Rogue River–Siskiyou National Forest is located in parts of four counties in southwestern Oregon and northwestern California. In descending order of land area they are Curry, Josephine, and Coos counties in Oregon and Del Norte County in California. There are local ranger district offices located in Cave Junction, Gold Beach, and Powers.

Nearly all of the national forest is mountainous and includes parts of the Southern Oregon Coast Range, the Klamath Mountains, and the Cascade Range.

The largest river in the national forest is the Rogue River, which originates in the Cascade Range and flows through the Klamath Mountains and Coast Range.  The Illinois River is a major tributary of the Rogue in the Klamath Mountains, while the Sixes, Elk, Pistol, Chetco, and Winchuck rivers drain the Coast Range directly to the Pacific Ocean.

Climate

History 

The Siskiyou National Forest was established on October 5, 1906.  On July 1, 1908, it absorbed Coquille National Forest and other lands. Rogue River National Forest traces its establishment back to the creation of the Ashland Forest Reserve on September 28, 1893, by the General Land Office.  The lands were transferred to the Forest Service in 1906, and it became a National Forest on March 4, 1907. On July 1, 1908, Ashland was combined with other lands from Cascade, Klamath and Siskiyou National Forests to establish Crater National Forest. On July 18, 1915, part of Paulina National Forest was added, and on July 9, 1932, the name was changed to Rogue River.

World War II bombing 

On September 9, 1942, an airplane dropped bombs on Mount Emily in the Siskiyou National Forest, turned around, and flew back over the Pacific Ocean. The bombs exploded and started a fire, which was put out by several forest service employees. Bomb fragments were said to have Japanese markings.  Stewart Holbrook vividly described this event in his essay "First Bomb". It was later confirmed that the plane was indeed Japanese, and the incident became known as the Lookout Air Raids. It was the second bombing of the continental United States by an enemy aircraft, three months after the air attack by Japan on Dutch Harbor three months earlier on June 3–4.

Natural features 

The national forest is home to some stands of old growth, including Port Orford cedar and Douglas fir in the Copper Salmon area.  A 1993 Forest Service study estimated that the extent of old growth in the forest was  some of which occurs in the Red Buttes Wilderness. Blue oak, Quercus douglasii, and Canyon live oak, Quercus chrysolepis occur in the Siskiyou National Forest. For the California endemic Blue Oak, the disjunctive stands are occurring near the northern limit of its range, which occur no farther north than Del Norte County. The world's tallest pine tree is a  ponderosa and is located in the national forest.

Protected areas 

The Rogue River–Siskiyou National Forest contains all or part of eight separate wilderness areas, which together add up to :

Copper Salmon Wilderness - 
Grassy Knob Wilderness - 
Kalmiopsis Wilderness - 
Red Buttes Wilderness - 
Rogue–Umpqua Divide Wilderness - 
Siskiyou Wilderness - 
Sky Lakes Wilderness - 
Wild Rogue Wilderness -

See also 
High Cascades Complex Fires
List of U.S. National Forests
List of old growth forests

References

External links 

Rogue River–Siskiyou National Forest

 
National Forests of California
National Forests of Oregon
Old-growth forests
Klamath Mountains
Rogue River (Oregon)
Cascade Range
Protected areas of Coos County, Oregon
Protected areas of Curry County, Oregon
Protected areas of Del Norte County, California
Protected areas of Siskiyou County, California
Protected areas of Jackson County, Oregon
Protected areas of Klamath County, Oregon
Protected areas of Douglas County, Oregon
Protected areas of Josephine County, Oregon
Protected areas established in 2004
2004 establishments in Oregon